The Central Burying Ground is a cemetery in Boston, Massachusetts.  It was established on Boston Common in 1756. It is located on Boylston Street between Tremont Street and Charles Street.

Famous burials there include the artist Gilbert Stuart, painter of the famed portraits of George Washington and Martha Washington, and the composer William Billings, who wrote the famous colonial hymn "Chester." Also buried there are Samuel Sprague and his son, Charles Sprague, one of America's earliest poets. Samuel Sprague was a participant in the Boston Tea Party and fought in the American Revolutionary War.

When the Tremont Street subway was under construction in the 1890s, burials were discovered in the area abutting the cemetery.  These were reinterred in a mass grave within the bounds of the burying ground.

Notable burials
 "British soldiers who died of disease during the occupation of the city [1775–1776], and those who died of wounds received at Bunker Hill"
 Caleb Davis (1738–1797)
 William Billings (1746–1800), composer
 John Baptiste Julien (d.1805), proprietor of Julien's Restorator
 Gilbert Stuart (1755–1828)
 Charles Sprague (1791–1875)

See also
 Funerary art in Puritan New England
 List of cemeteries in Boston, Massachusetts

Image gallery

References

Further reading
 Nathaniel Bradstreet Shurtleff. "Central Burying-Ground." A topographical and historical description of Boston, Part 1, 2nd ed. Boston: Printed by request of the City Council, 1871.

External links

  – City of Boston
 
 Google news archive. Articles about the Central Burying Ground

1756 establishments in the Thirteen Colonies
History of Boston
Cemeteries in Boston
Boston Theater District
Boston Common
Cemeteries established in the 18th century